is an arcade racing game from Sega. It was released in 1986 with two arcade cabinet versions, a stand-up cabinet with handlebars and a full-sized dirt bike cabinet. It is often seen as a dirt racing version of Hang-On, as it uses a similar engine and PCB. The game was later released for the Master System in 1987, the ZX Spectrum and Commodore 64 in 1988, and the Amstrad CPC and Atari ST in 1989.

Gameplay

Enduro Racer is a motorcycle racing game based on the sport of Enduro. The player rides a dirt bike through seven stages, which have elevation changes and turns, and must avoid other riders as well as logs and boulders. Controls for the game are based on a motorcycle's handlebars, with a throttle and brake control. Players can pull up the handlebars on the cabinet to perform a wheelie. Jumping over logs is also possible, but players have to land with the wheelie technique or risk crashing. During the race, players are competing against a timer. Though the timer stops when the player has crashed, restarting is slow and consumes time.

Development 
Prior to the development of Enduro Racer, Sega game developer Yu Suzuki created Hang-On, his second game with the company. After deciding to make a motorcycle racing game, he had to decide on a style of racing for the game. Suzuki himself was a fan of dirt bikes, along with motocross and Enduro. However, Sega's market research concluded that road-based GP 500 racing was more popular worldwide, so it was selected for use for Hang-On. Enduro Racer became Suzuki's opportunity to develop a dirt bike game.

Enduro Racer was ported to numerous systems, including the Master System, Commodore 64, ZX Spectrum, Amstrad CPC, and Atari ST. Activision handled the computer ports. The Commodore 64 port possesses four levels, with the third and fourth being more difficult versions of the first and second, while the ZX Spectrum version has five tracks and two-player multiplayer.

Reception

In Japan, Game Machine listed Enduro Racer on their August 15, 1986 issue as being the most-successful upright/cockpit arcade unit of the month, and it remained at the top of the charts through September and October 1986. It was Japan's second highest-grossing upright/cockpit arcade game during the latter half of 1986, just below Sega's Space Harrier. It was Japan's sixth highest-grossing upright/cockpit arcade game of 1986.

In the United Kingdom, it was the eighth highest-grossing arcade game of 1986 in London. The ZX Spectrum version of the game went to number 2 on the UK sales charts in August 1987, below BMX Simulator. Enduro Racer later topped the UK budget sales chart in June 1988.

In January 1987, Clare Edgeley reviewed the arcade game in Computer and Video Games, praising it as "brilliant" and calling it a different game from Hang-On. In 1993, the Spectrum port and was voted number 50 in the Your Sinclair Official Top 100 Games of All Time. A reviewer for Computer and Video Games praised the Spectrum port for being as close to an accurate arcade version as the Spectrum hardware can handle, with smooth graphics. John Gilbert of Sinclair User also gave high praise to the Spectrum version, stating that the conversion "puts other top software houses to shame".

Writing for Commodore User, reviewer Ferdy Hamilton was disappointed in the Commodore 64's release, citing the "blob-like sprites", jerking controls, and that the conversion could have been better than that for the ZX Spectrum, which he called "unfaultable". Three reviewers for Zzap!64 were highly critical of the Commodore 64 port, slamming the game's poor features with one reviewer stating: "It doesn't look, sound, or play anything like the original - in fact, it doesn't play at all well full stop". A reviewer for ACE wrote that the Atari ST version is a good conversion of the original but that the replacement of the bike noises with music might disappoint some.

It was re-released for the Wii's Virtual Console in North America on December 15, 2008 and in Europe on January 9, 2009.

References

External links
 
 
 Enduro Racer review by Your Sinclair
 Enduro Racer  for the Wii Virtual Console

1986 video games
Amstrad CPC games
Arcade video games
Atari ST games
Commodore 64 games
Motorcycle video games
Off-road racing video games
Sega arcade games
Sega video games
Master System games
Virtual Console games
ZX Spectrum games
Video games scored by David Whittaker
Video games scored by Hiroshi Kawaguchi
Video games designed by Yu Suzuki
Video games developed in Japan